Shiv Nath Prasad (1922–) was an Indian architect and urban planner known for his Brutalist architecture designs. He was also called the "Le Corbusier of India".

Biography 

Shiv Nath was born in Varanasi, British India in 1922.

His work is influenced by Le Corbusier, even though it is not completely clear if the two have ever worked together or not.

His works include the Akbar Hotel in Chanakyapuri, New Delhi, which was constructed between 1965–69 with Mahendra Raj for the India Tourism Development Corporation. It has elements of Le Corbusier's Unité d'habitation. The Shri Ram Centre for Performing Arts was constructed from 1966–69 and Tibet House in 1970.

Prasad died in the early 2000s.

See also 
 Jugal Kishore Choudhury
 Kuldip Singh (architect)

References

External links 

1922 births
2000s deaths
Year of death uncertain
20th-century Indian architects
Brutalist architects
Indian urban planners